Janet Beecher (born Janet Meysenberg; October 21, 1884 – August 6, 1955) was an American stage and screen actress.

Early years
The daughter of Mr. and Mrs. E. A. Von Meysenburg, Beecher was born in Jefferson City, Missouri. Her sister was actress Olive Wyndham. The sisters were related to Harriet Beecher Stowe on their mother's side.

Her father's work as a vice-consul for Germany led to her growing up in Chicago.

Career
Beecher was a supporting player and lead on the Broadway stage between the 1900s and 1940s. Her Broadway debut came in The Education of Mr. Pipp (1905). Her final Broadway play was The Late George Apley (1944).  Other notable plays she appeared in included The Lottery Man (1909), The Concert (1910), The Purple Road (1913), Fair and Warmer (1915), The Woman in Room 13 (1919), Call the Doctor (1920), A Bill of Divorcement (1921), The Love Child (1922), A Kiss in a Taxi (1925), and Courage (1928).

Between 1915 and 1943, she appeared in about motion pictures. She remains perhaps best-remembered as a character actress during Hollywood's golden age, often seen in roles as "firm but compassionate matriarchs". She was known for her roles as Ginger Rogers' mother in The Story of Vernon and Irene Castle (1939), Tyrone Power's mother in the adventure film The Mark of Zorro (1940), and Henry Fonda's mother in Preston Sturges' screwball comedy The Lady Eve (1941). She retired from film business in 1943, but managed to play a role in the television series Lux Video Theatre in 1952.

Personal life
Beecher was married twice: first to Harry R. Guggenheimer and then to Richard H. Hoffman. She had one child, a son named Richard, by her second marriage.

"Automatic writing" controversy
Automatic writing played a pivotal role in Beecher's divorce from her second husband, Richard Hoffman. 

Beecher's mother, Mrs. Oral J. Wyndham, produced messages that she said were sent by spirits, but which Hoffman said were created by Wyndham's subconscious mind. After six years of marriage, both Beecher and Hoffman filed suit for separation, based on both the contentious messages and a disagreement about religion's influence in raising their son. Beecher, her sister, and their mother were members of the Unity Scientific Christianity Association. The judge who granted the divorce wrote, "both the practice of spirit writing and the content of the messages undoubtedly affected the family society. The plaintiff was frankly hostile to the practice, while some of the writings criticized his character and behavior in unmistakable terms."

Death
On August 7, 1955, Beecher died at her sister's home in Washington, Connecticut, at age 70.

Filmography

References

External links

1884 births
1955 deaths
American stage actresses
American film actresses
People from Jefferson City, Missouri
20th-century American actresses